The 1992 World Rowing Championships were World Rowing Championships that were held from 13 to 16 August 1992 in Montreal, Quebec, Canada. Since 1992 was an Olympic year for rowing, the World Championships did not include Olympic events scheduled for the 1992 Summer Olympics.

Medal summary

Medalists at the 1992 World Rowing Championships were:

Men's lightweight events

Women's lightweight events

References

Rowing competitions in Canada
World Rowing Championships
World Rowing Championships
1992 in Quebec
1992 in Canadian sports
Rowing
Rowing